Thomas Philip Maunsell (16 October 1781 – 4 March 1866) was a British Conservative politician.

Born at Thorpe Malsor, Northamptonshire, Maunsell was the son of William Maunsell, Archdeacon of Kildare, and his wife Lucy, daughter of Philip Oliver. He married Caroline Elizabeth Cokayne, daughter of William Cokayne and Barbara née Hill in 1811 in London, and they had at least nine children: John Borlase; William Thomas (1812–1862); Lucy Diana (1814–1892); George Edmond (1816–1875); Thomas Cokayne (1818–1887); John Borlase (1820–1902); Sophia Caroline (1822–1889); Barbara Anna (1825–1842); and Charles Cullen (1827–1891).

Maunsell was first elected Conservative MP for North Northamptonshire at a by-election in 1835—caused by the death of William Wentworth-FitzWilliam—and held the seat until 1857 when he did not stand for re-election.

Outside of politics, Maunsell was High Sheriff of Northamptonshire in 1821, and colonel in the Northamptonshire Militia. He was also a Justice of the Peace and Deputy Lieutenant for the same county.

References

External links
 

Conservative Party (UK) MPs for English constituencies
UK MPs 1835–1837
UK MPs 1837–1841
UK MPs 1841–1847
UK MPs 1847–1852
UK MPs 1852–1857
1781 births
1866 deaths
High Sheriffs of Northamptonshire
English justices of the peace
Deputy Lieutenants of Northamptonshire